"Groovejet (If This Ain't Love)" is a song by Italian electronic music producer Spiller with lead vocals performed by British singer-songwriter Sophie Ellis-Bextor. Various versions of the single were later featured on the German reissue and some UK editions of Ellis-Bextor's debut solo album, Read My Lips.

The single was released on 14 August 2000 by Positiva Records. In addition to receiving critical acclaim, it became a hit in Europe and Australia, peaking at number one in the United Kingdom, New Zealand, Ireland, and Australia, and it reached number three on the US Billboard Hot Dance Club Play chart. On 22 July 2013, the song was certified platinum by the British Phonographic Industry (BPI), and it has sold 642,000 copies in the UK as of March 2019.

Background
The track was originally created by Spiller in early 1999 as an instrumental, with no singing, and was included on the Mighty Miami EP. It is mainly built upon samples from "Love Is You", a disco song originally performed by Carol Williams with the Salsoul Orchestra. The origin of the song title is taken from the name of South Beach, Miami nightclub 'Groovejet', where the song was first played (as an instrumental) in 1999.

In order to make the track more palatable for airplay, as the instrumental is somewhat repetitive, Positiva Records asked British singer Sophie Ellis-Bextor, formerly with indie rock band theaudience, to provide lyrics and vocals for the song. Before recording, Ellis-Bextor's lyric was partly reworked by Rob Davis, who replaced her hook "And so it goes... how does it feel so good?" with "If this ain't love... why does it feel so good?", thereby providing the song with its subtitle. Boris Dlugosch produced the vocal portions added to the track. Sharon Scott is the back-up vocalist.

The track has been remixed by Boris Dlugosch and Michi Lange, Todd Terry, Solar, Ramon "Ray Roc" Checo and Ernest St. Laurent. "Groovejet" was the first song ever to be played on an iPod, specifically on a prototype unit in August 2001. Upon its inclusion on Now That's What I Call Music! 46 in the UK, released a month before the single, the booklet write-up correctly predicted it to be a hit.

Critical reception
"Groovejet (If This Ain't Love)" has received critical acclaim. Piers Martin of NME was favourable, saying "this is a slip of irresistible ice-filtered summer funk. This year's 'Sing It Back' and 'Music Sounds Better with You', if you will." Stylus Magazine's Dom Passantino rated the single 8/10, describing the song as "handbag house's last hurrah, except we'd stopped drinking Hooch by then and it was all about sambucca..."

Tom Ewing of Freaky Trigger rated the single 9 out of 10, saying: "There's a beautiful tension in 'Groovejet', an apt flirtation between Bextor’s languid, cut-glass vocals and the delightful indulgence of Spiller's music. It’s not just any disco he's reviving, after all. No Chic for Spiller, none of that poise or aspirational elegance. The sounds 'Groovejet' loots are the syn-drums and ray-gun synths of disco's overripe peak and decline, when it was corny, wonderful, mass-market pop music: you can hear hints of Kelly Marie or Amii Stewart in the song, before that sweetness falls back into the dreamy groove. 'Groovejet' is a fond tour of disco when it ruled the world, and proof that it still could." He described the music's sophistication as coming from Ellis-Bextor, who "offsets the track's bubbly repetition, adds a bittersweet note without ever sounding like she's above it. In fact she sounds carried along by it."

The song was ranked at number 486 in Pitchfork Media's list of the Top 500 Tracks of the 2000s. Mixmag included "Groovejet (If This Ain't Love)" in their list of "The 30 best vocal house anthems ever" in 2018. In 2003, Q Magazine ranked "Groovejet (If This Ain't Love)" at number 782 in their list of the "1001 Best Songs Ever".

Commercial performance
In the United Kingdom, the single was first released in the same week as "Out of Your Mind", Victoria Beckham's first solo single. "Out of Your Mind" held the midweek number one in the UK singles chart until Saturday, when "Groovejet (If This Ain't Love)" overtook it in sales; it was hyped by the media as a personal battle between the two artists. The song was the eighth best-selling song of 2000 in the UK. A live version of the track appeared as a B-side to Ellis-Bextor's single Music Gets The Best of Me, and in 2003, "Groovejet (If This Ain't Love)" was re-released as part of Positiva Records 'Remixed' series. In April 2015, the Official Charts Company announced that "Groovejet" was the biggest-selling vinyl single of the millennium in the UK.

The single also found success worldwide. It reached number one in Ireland (two weeks), Australia (three weeks), and New Zealand (seven weeks). In mainland Europe, it charted within the top five in Iceland, Norway, and Switzerland while becoming a top-ten hit in Denmark, Finland, Hungary, Italy, the Netherlands, and Portugal. On the Eurochart Hot 100, it peaked at number 12 on 21 October 2000. In the United States, "Groovejet" peaked at number 27 on the Billboard Hot Dance Music/Maxi-Singles Sales chart and number three on the Billboard Hot Dance Club Play chart. The track has earned platinum certifications in Australia, New Zealand, and the UK.

Music video
The music video for the song shows Spiller and Ellis-Bextor making their way separately around Bangkok. Spiller meets people and signs autographs, finding his height makes life there difficult; Ellis-Bextor sings wistfully at various tables in bars. Spiller takes a taxicab while Ellis-Bextor takes a tuk-tuk, and eventually, they meet at a nightclub.

Track listings

European CD single
 "Groovejet (If This Ain't Love)" (radio edit) – 3:43
 "Groovejet (If This Ain't Love)" (instrumental radio) – 3:30
 "Groovejet (If This Ain't Love)" (BMR's club cut) – 6:57
 "Groovejet (If This Ain't Love)" (Spiller's extended vocal mix) – 7:28
 "Groovejet (If This Ain't Love)" (Todd Terry's In House remix) – 6:51
 "Groove Jet" – 6:18

UK CD single
 "Groovejet (If This Ain't Love)" (radio edit) – 3:47
 "Groovejet" – 6:18
 "Groovejet" (Solar's Jet Groove dub mix) – 8:18

UK 12-inch single
A1. "Groovejet (If This Ain't Love)" (Spiller's extended vocal mix) – 7:27
AA1. "Groovejet" – 6:18
AA2. "Groovejet" (Solar's Jet Groove dub mix) – 5:55

German maxi-single
 "Groovejet (If This Ain't Love) (radio edit) – 3:41
 "Groovejet (If This Ain't Love) (original version) – 6:16
 "Groovejet (If This Ain't Love) (BMR's club cut) – 6:57
 "Groovejet (If This Ain't Love) (Spiller's extended vocal mix) – 7:26
 "Groovejet (If This Ain't Love) (Todd Terry's In House remix) – 6:47
 "Groovejet (If This Ain't Love) (Ray Roc's Trackworks Remix Part II) – 8:10

Charts

Weekly charts

Year-end charts

Decade-end charts

Certifications

Release history

References

2000 debut singles
2000 songs
House music songs
Irish Singles Chart number-one singles
Number-one singles in Australia
Number-one singles in New Zealand
Number-one singles in Scotland
Positiva Records singles
Songs written by Rob Davis (musician)
Songs written by Sophie Ellis-Bextor
Sophie Ellis-Bextor songs
UK Singles Chart number-one singles